Neil Diamond 50 – 50th Anniversary Collection is a retrospective of 50 Neil Diamond songs recorded between 1966 and 2014. It was released in March 2017. 

Diamond selected the songs for Neil Diamond 50. Its tracks range from the 1966 album The Feel of Neil Diamond to 2014's Melody Road. A three-disc set with liner notes by David Fricke, it includes songs that Rolling Stone described as "staples in the American pop songbook".

A 50th Anniversary World Tour coincided with the release of the box. It began on April 7, 2017, in Fresno, California.

Track listing

Charts

References

2017 compilation albums
Neil Diamond compilation albums